The River Derry is a large  river in the southeast of Leinster, Ireland, a tributary of the Slaney. It rises just south of Hacketstown, County Carlow, Ireland. It flows southeast to Tinahely, being accompanied by the R747 regional road for the distance.

South of Tinahely it turns sharply and flows southwest through Shillelagh, briefly forming the border between County Wicklow and County Wexford, before becoming the border between County Wexford and County Carlow.

It flows under Clonegal Bridge at a point where it divides Clonegal, County Carlow to the west from Watch House Village, County Wexford, to the east.

A few kilometres further downstream it flows into the River Slaney.

Derry Water River is a separate tributary, which rises near Tinahely and flows north-eastwards to form the Aughrim River.

See also
Rivers of Ireland

References

External links

Rivers of County Wicklow
Rivers of County Wexford
Rivers of County Carlow